Jonathan C. Gibralter (born 1956) is an American academic executive and president of Wells College in Aurora, Cayuga County, New York. Previously, he was also the 14th president of Frostburg State University in Maryland, from August 2006 to June 30, 2015, as well as president of Farmingdale State College in East Farmingdale, New York from 2001 to 2006.

Early life and education
Gibralter grew up in Bayside, Queens, New York and attended Queensborough Community College, earned a bachelor of arts degree in psychology from Binghamton University in 1978, a master of arts degree in counseling psychology from New York University in 1982, a Ph.D. in human development from Syracuse University in 1996, and an MBA from University of Maryland University College in 2013.

Career
In 1986, he got a teaching position at the State University of New York at Morrisville, later becoming Director of Individual Studies (1988-1990) and Associate Dean for the School of Liberal Arts (1990-1993). From 1993 to 1998, Gibralter was the dean of the Rome, New York campus of Mohawk Valley Community College. Gibralter was the Dean of Academic Affairs, and then Interim President, at Corning Community College from 1998 to 2001.

He was president of Farmingdale State College in East Farmingdale, New York from 2001 to 2006. In 2006, he became president of Frostburg State University in Frostburg, Maryland and remained in that position until 2015. In 2015, he became president of Wells College.

Honors and awards
In September 2008, Gibralter was honored with the Presidential Leadership Award for his efforts in promoting a campus climate that de-emphasizes alcohol and combats binge drinking at Frostburg State University.

Personal life
Gibralter is the father of two adult sons and is married to Laurie Gibralter.

References

External links
Jonathan Gibralter at Wells College

Frostburg State University faculty
Living people
1956 births
New York University alumni
Binghamton University alumni
People from Bayside, Queens
Syracuse University alumni
Farmingdale State College faculty
People from Suffolk County, New York
Wells College faculty
Morrisville State College faculty
Queensborough Community College alumni